West Dabusun or  is an ephemeral lake northwest of Golmud in the Haixi Prefecture of Qinghai Province in northwestern China. Comprising a basin in the Qarhan Playa, it fills when meltwater floods the Golmud River, causing it to spill into subsidiary channels west of the main course to Dabusun Lake. Like the other lakes of the surrounding Qaidam Basin, it is extremely saline.

Name
Dabusun or Dabsan is a romanization of a Mongolian name meaning "Salt Lake". The adjective "west" distinguishes it from nearby Dabusun Lake. Dabuxun is the pinyin romanization of the Mandarin pronunciation of the same name's transcription into characters. Xi Dabsan or Xidabuxun are the same names, prefixed with the Chinese word for "West".

Geography
Although sometimes listed as perennial, it is an ephemeral saline lake fed by the "Yuejin River"   Yuèjìn Hé), a subsidiary western channel of the Golmud that periodically fill with meltwater.

The lake's position towards the southern end of the playa means that its waters are relatively less influenced by the concentrated mineral springs along the playa's northern boundary.

History

West Dabusun Lake formed in 1967.

See also
 Qarhan Playa and Qaidam Basin
 List of lakes and saltwater lakes of China

References

Citations

Bibliography
 .
 .
 .
 .
 .
 .
 .
 .

Lakes of China
Lakes of Qinghai
Haixi Mongol and Tibetan Autonomous Prefecture